Is a surname with Chinese origin. It is transliterated as Mei in Chinese and Mae in Korean but is very rare in Korea.

It is also the Chinese surname Mai which is transliterated as Mạch in Vietnamese.

Notable people with the surname Mai
 Mai An Tiêm.
Mai Thúc Loan (Mai Hắc Đế), the Vietnamese leader of the 722 uprisings against the rule of the Tang Dynasty in the region of Ái and Hoan provinces (now Thanh Hóa and Nghệ An of Vietnam).  
Mai Văn Cường, Mikoyan-Gurevich MiG-21 pilot of the Vietnamese People's Air Force
Mai Huu Xuan, general of the Army of the Republic of Vietnam
Mai Phương Thúy, Miss Viet Nam 2006
Mai Tiến Thành, footballer 
Jeannie Mai, television personality
 Mai Đức Chung, football coach.

Vietnamese-language surnames